The College Ground is a cricket ground in the grounds of Cheltenham College in Cheltenham, Gloucestershire, England. Gloucestershire County Cricket Club have played more than 300 first-class and more than 70 List A matches there. It also hosted a women's One-Day International between England and Australia in 2005.

The College Ground first hosted first-class cricket in 1872 when Gloucestershire played Surrey; Gloucestershire won the game by an innings and 37 runs thanks largely to W. G. Grace's match haul of 12–63. In August 1876, Grace became the first man to score a triple century in a county match when he hit 318 not out against Yorkshire; he had made the first triple hundred in all first-class cricket for the Gentlemen of Marylebone Cricket Club at Canterbury just one week earlier.

The Cheltenham Cricket Festival, held during the school holidays, has been a part of Gloucestershire's season ever since the 1870s.

See also
List of cricket grounds in England and Wales

Notes

External links
 College Ground, Cheltenham at CricketArchive
 College Ground, Cheltenham at Cricinfo

Cricket grounds in Gloucestershire
Sports venues in Cheltenham